Northern Catalonia, North Catalonia, French Catalonia or Roussillon refers to the Catalan-speaking and Catalan-culture territory ceded to France by Spain through the signing of the Treaty of the Pyrenees in 1659 in exchange of France's effective renunciation on the formal protection that it had given to the recently founded Catalan Republic. The area corresponds roughly to the modern French département of the Pyrénées-Orientales which were historically part of Catalonia since the old County of Barcelona, and lasted during the times of the Crown of Aragon and the Principality of Catalonia until they were given to France by Spain.

The equivalent term in French, Catalogne Nord, is used nowadays, although less often than the more politically neutral Roussillon (Catalan: Rosselló); Rousillon, though, historically did not comprise Vallespir, Conflent and Cerdagne (Cerdanya). Often the terms Pays Catalan (País Català), "Catalan Country" may be used.

Geography 

Northern Catalonia forms a triangle between the Pyrenees to the south, the Corbières Massif to the north-west and the Mediterranean Sea to the east. The Roussillon plain in the east, by far the most populated area, is formed by the flood plains of the rivers Tech, Têt, and Agly. The districts of Vallespir and Conflent cover the upper valleys of the Tech and the Têt respectively. The massif of the Canigou, 2785 m, dominates much of the territory.

The climate is of the Mediterranean type, with hot, dry summers and winters which are relatively mild, at least on the Roussillon plain where snow is rare.

The city of Perpignan accounts for over a quarter of the population, over one-third of its urban area is taken into account, and is the only major administrative and service center. Major road and rail links run north–south through Northern Catalonia between France and Spain, while a railway line also links Perpignan to Latour-de-Carol (Catalan: La Tor de Querol) via Prades (Catalan: Prada de Conflent or Prada).

Cerdagne 
Haute-Cerdagne is geographically distinct from the rest of Northern Catalonia, lying to the south of the Pyrenean watershed in the upper valley of the Segre. It is a mountainous and sparsely-populated district, and includes the town of Llívia (pop. 1252 (2005)) which is an exclave of Spain.

The district lies on the most direct route between Toulouse and Barcelona (via Foix and Ripoll), and a railway line still links the two cities via Latour-de-Carol.

Administrative history

Spanish marches and the County of Barcelona 

Northern Catalonia formed part of the Spanish Marches, established by Charlemagne as a buffer territory against the Moorish forces. As such, it was divided into feudal counties, Rosselló, Vallespir, Conflent north of the Pyrenees and Cerdanya to the south. By the end of the ninth century, these counties had gained de facto independence from the Carolingian kings and operated as princely states (whose rulers nevertheless retained the title of count).

As the seigneury of the counties became hereditary, the total number of Catalan counts fell steadily. One individual often had the charge of several counties, but these were not always transmitted based on primogeniture. Hence Count Miró II the Young, third son of Wilfred I the Hairy, inherited the counties of Cerdanya and Conflent from his father in 897, and the counties of Besalú and Vallespir from his elder brother Sunyer I when the latter became Count of Barcelona in 911.

The Counts of Rosselló, in alliance with their cousins the Counts of Empuriés, tried to resist this dilution of their power. However, the Counts of Barcelona steadily gained suzerainty over the other Catalan counts, a process that was virtually complete by the twelfth century. The last Count of Rosselló, Girard II, left his title to the Crown of Aragon on his death in 1172 to prevent the territory passing to his illegitimate half-brothers.

Crown of Aragon and the Monarchy of Spain 
Royal administration in the Principality of Catalonia under the Crown of Aragon was organized based on vegueries, under the charge of a veguer appointed by the King of Aragon as Count of Barcelona. In Northern Catalonia, the vegueries followed closely the boundaries of the old counties. The district of Capcir was a sotsvegueria, based around the castle of Puigbalador (French: Puyvalador) but subordinate to the vegueria of Conflent.

The Treaty of Corbeil of 1258 confirmed the frontier between France and Aragon as the Cerbères, leaving the Occitan district of Fenolheda to France.

On the death of King James I the Conqueror in 1276, Northern Catalonia was combined with the Balearic Isles to form a new Kingdom of Majorca, which passed to James II while the rest of the territory of the Crown of Aragon passed to his brother Peter III. This division satisfied neither branch of the family, and the Kingdom of Majorca was retaken militarily by the Crown of Aragon in 1344, reintegrating the Roussillon and Cerdanya into the Principality.

After the Treaty of the Pyrenees and cession to France 

The Treaty of the Pyrenees of 1659 ceded Northern Catalonia to France, where it became the province of Roussillon. The French provinces were abolished at the Revolution (Law of 1789-12-22), and Roussillon was joined with the district of Fenouillèdes (Occitan: Fenolheda) to form the département of the Pyrénées-Orientales, with Perpignan (Perpinyà) as its administrative centre.

Present day 

The département of the Pyrénées-Orientales is divided into the arrondissements of Céret (Catalan: Ceret), Perpignan (Perpinyà) and Prades (Prada de Conflent), which are further divided into cantons and communes. Perpignan and sixteen surrounding communes are also associated in the Communauté d'agglomération Têt Méditerranée, created in 2001. Enclaved in the southwest of the département there is the Spanish (Catalonia) exclave of Llívia.

As is common, the present-day arrondissements do not correspond to pre-Revolutionary boundaries. The arrondissement of Prades (Prada) covers the whole of Haute-Cerdagne (Alta Cerdanya) and Conflent (including Capcir), as well as about a third of Fenolheda (not part of the province of Roussillon). The arrondissement of Céret covers the whole of Vallespir but also the Côte Vermeille (Costa Vermella), which was historically under the control of the counts and veguers of Rosselló at Perpinyà (Perpignan).

Catalan writers sometimes speak of the "comarques of Northern Catalonia". Unlike the autonomous community of Catalonia, these comarques have no administrative significance, although they usually correspond to a certain historical and geographical unity. A commonly used division is that of Joan Becat in his 1977 work Atles de Catalunya Nord, which follows closely the boundaries of the former vegueries except insofar as it promotes the former sotsvegueria of Capcir (177 km², pop. 1532 (1990)) to a full comarca.

Politics
The region is divided among those who support a union with France and those who support reuniting with Catalonia. A large majority of Northern Catalans oppose reuniting with Catalonia, but the Catalan Unity political party promotes the idea. The party has had some success since 1993, winning seats in municipal elections. It is now the most popular Catalan nationalist party in the region.

Northern Catalans are proud of their Catalan heritage and have developed a "Northern Catalan" identity. However, unlike their Southern neighbors in Spanish Catalonia, the Catalan identity is not a nationalist movement in French Catalonia. According to a 2020 study, French Catalans experienced mass education in the second half of the 19th century, leading them to adopt French patriotism. Catalans in Spain were mass educated in the early 20th century locally by Catalans and not by a strong Spanish state, which led to the formation of a salient Catalan national identity.

In 2016, Northern Catalonia was merged with other areas of Occitania to form a new French region. This has led to fears that the Occitan language and culture will be given precedence over the Catalan language and culture.

In December 2017, Express.co.uk reported that 2000 people took part in a protest in Perpignan, in order to get the French government to hold a referendum on Northern Catalonia reuniting with Southern Catalonia. Northern Catalans helped print ballot slips for the 2017 Catalan independence referendum.

Language and culture

Prominence of Catalan heritage
Language
Catalan is spoken in all regions of Northern Catalonia except for Fenolleda which speaks the related (and mutually intelligible) Occitan language.

In Perpignan, where a quarter of the population lives, 44% know the Catalan language.

Other
The Catalan folk dance Sardana is a dance in the region. Northern Catalans support the USAP rugby union team and the Catalans Dragons rugby league team. There are four castells (Catalan human towers) teams in Northern Catalonia.

Recognition
French is the only official language in France as a whole, and therefore of these municipalities. Catalan, in its Northern Catalan variety, is however recognized as a regional language by the region of Languedoc-Roussillon which contains Northern Catalunya; this recognition provides cultural support in education and public media, with some more regional power since the laws of regionalization of France during the 1980s. The language is estimated to be spoken by 34% of the population of Northern Catalonia, but understood by 65%.

On 10 December 2007, the General Council of the Pyrénées-Orientales proclaimed Catalan as one of the languages of the department, alongside French and Occitan (in Fenouillèdes), The 'Charter in Support of Catalan' was adopted which called for the inclusion of the Catalan language on signs and its use in material produced by the administrative department.

Suppression
In 1700, the government of Louis XIV prohibited the use of the Catalan language in official documents, although the government only irregularly enforced the edict throughout the eighteenth century.

In Perpignan Catalan was also prohibited from being used by priests during Mass.

From 1700 all public acts had to be written in French, from 1738 this was extended to include registers of births, marriages and deaths.

In the 1950s, after centuries of being forbidden in education, the Catalan language was permitted to be studied for one hour per week in secondary school. In the 1970s, the Arrels Association and la Bressola network of private schools started to offer complete bilingual French/Catalan classes from nursery up to secondary education.

Leisure 
North Catalonia is one of just two regions in France where Spanish-suited playing cards are used. The region has its own French Catalan pattern cards which are used to play local games like a variant of Spanish Truc.

See also 

 Albera Massif
 Language policy in France
 Sport in Catalonia
 County of Roussillon
 Northern Basque Country

Notes

References

External links
"Catalunya del Nord" from the Enciclopèdia catalana

Media 
Flaix FM radio station
Ràdio Arrels radio station
Catalunya Info radio station
La Clau magazine in Catalan & French
Dimonis magazine
Editorial del Trabucaire publishing house
Llibreria Catalana Catalan bookstore in Perpinyà (Perpignan)
Mirmanda Cultural Journal in Catalan & French

Associations 
La Bressola – organises primary education in Catalan
La Porta dels Països Catalans 
Aire Nou de Bao

Essays 
Qui som els catalans del nord? (Who are we Northern Catalans?)
Catalan, Occitan and French toponomy in Northern Catalonia

Miscellaneous sites 
Catalunya-Nord.com 
VilaWeb Catalunya Nord

 
Principality of Catalonia
Geography of Pyrénées-Orientales
Catalan Countries